Leptosiphon pachyphyllus (syn. Linanthus pachyphyllus) is a species of flowering plant in the phlox family, known by the common name Sierra linanthus.

Distribution
The plant is endemic to eastern California, where it grows in the Sierra Nevada, and in the Owens Valley and Glass Mountain areas to the east in the Great Basin region.

Description
Leptosiphon pachyphyllus is a perennial herb, nearly identical to its relative, Leptosiphon nuttallii, but may grow slightly larger. It is lined with leaves, each divided into five linear lobes.

The bloom period is June through September.

External links
 Calflora Database: Leptosiphon pachyphyllus (Sierra linanthus)
 Jepson Manual eFlora (TJM2) treatment of Leptosiphon pachyphyllus

pachyphyllus
Endemic flora of California
Flora of the Sierra Nevada (United States)
Flora of the Great Basin
Flora without expected TNC conservation status